Danny Talbot (born 1 May 1991) is a retired British sprinter who competed in the 100 metres and the 200 metres.

Career
Talbot won the 200m bronze medal at the 2012 European Athletics Championships in Helsinki.  For Team GB in the 4 × 100 m at the London 2012 Olympics, he ran the third leg in the heats but failed to exchange the baton with anchor Adam Gemili. He ran again for Britain in the 4 x 100 at the 2014 World Relay Championships, forming part of a quartet which ran 37.93 in the heats and went on to win bronze.

At the IAAF World Championships held in London in 2017, Talbot qualified for the 200 metres semifinal with a personal best of 20.16 in his heat on 7 August. Five days later he ran the third leg for the 4 x 100 metres relay team which won the gold medal in a time of 37.47, a British and European record.

Talbot retired from athletics competitions in December 2021.

Personal life
Talbot's father is British and his mother is half Trinidadian. Talbot attended St Augustine's Catholic College in Trowbridge, Wiltshire.

Competition record

1Did not finish in the final

References

External links

1991 births
Living people
People from Trowbridge
British male sprinters
English male sprinters
Olympic male sprinters
Olympic athletes of Great Britain
Athletes (track and field) at the 2012 Summer Olympics
Athletes (track and field) at the 2016 Summer Olympics
Commonwealth Games silver medallists for England
Commonwealth Games medallists in athletics
Athletes (track and field) at the 2014 Commonwealth Games
World Athletics Championships athletes for Great Britain
World Athletics Championships medalists
World Athletics Championships winners
European Athletics Championships medalists
British Athletics Championships winners
Team Bath track and field athletes
English sportspeople of Trinidad and Tobago descent
Medallists at the 2014 Commonwealth Games